Miss Venezuela 1968 was the 15th edition of Miss Venezuela pageant held at Teatro Altamira in Caracas, Venezuela, on June 25, 1968. The winner of the pageant was Peggy Kopp, Miss Distrito Federal.

The pageant was broadcast live by RCTV.

Results
Miss Venezuela 1968 - Peggy Kopp (Miss Distrito Federal)
1st runner-up - Cherry Núñez (Miss Miranda)
2nd runner-up - Jovann Navas (Miss Aragua)
3rd runner-up - Gloria Barboza (Miss Zulia)
4th runner-up - Anais Mejía (Miss Portuguesa)

Special awards
 Miss Fotogénica (Miss Photogenic) - Jovann Navas (Miss Aragua)
 Miss Simpatía (Miss Congeniality) - Mary Carmen Suero (Miss Trujillo)
 Miss Sonrisa (Best Smile) - Zully Guilarte (Miss Guárico)

Delegates

 Miss Aragua - Jovann Navas Ravelo
 Miss Bolívar - Elena Sánchez Ugueto
 Miss Distrito Federal - Peggy Kopp Arenas
 Miss Falcón - Magally Molleda Pérez
 Miss Guárico - Zully Guilarte Rosas
 Miss Lara - Nancy Piña Montes
 Miss Mérida - Maithe Brilhaut
 Miss Miranda - Cherry Núñez Rodríguez
 Miss Monagas - Matha Elizabeth Camino
 Miss Nueva Esparta - Norah Williams Troconis
 Miss Portuguesa - Anais Mejía Calzadilla
 Miss Sucre - Helena Correa Badaracco, mis bikini por primera vez en Venezuela.
 Miss Táchira - Maritza Loyola
 Miss Trujillo - Mary Carmen Suero
 Miss Zulia - Gloria Barboza Wulf

External links
Miss Venezuela official website

1968 beauty pageants
1968 in Venezuela